Visions of Atlantis is an Austrian metal band from Styria, founded in 2000. Inspiration came both from successful symphonic metal band Nightwish and from the myth of Atlantis.

History

Eternal Endless Infinity and lineup changes (2000–2004) 

Fascinated by the myth of Atlantis, Werner Fiedler, Thomas Caser, Christian Stani, and Chris Kamper decided in August 2000 to work out a concept inspired by the secret of Atlantis. Late in summer mezzo-soprano Nicole Bogner joined the project, and this was the birth of Visions of Atlantis. A first demo, Morning in Atlantis was released in 2000.

In 2001 they signed with TTS Media Music/Black Arrow Productions, and in 2002 their first album, Eternal Endless Infinity was released.

In 2003, the band saw some changes in lineup, replacing Christian Stani with Mario Plank and Chris Kamper with Miro Holly.

Cast Away and Nicole's departure (2004–2005) 
Now with Napalm Records, which released the band's second studio effort "Cast Away" worldwide in November 2004. To mark the release, Visions of Atlantis produced their first official music video to the track "Lost", which received significant airplay on VIVA and MTV, and made it possible for the band to present the album. In early 2005, Visions of Atlantis did their tour across Europe, while being supported by labelmates Elis and Celtic rock based band Lyriel.

In late 2005, Bogner left the band due to commitments elsewhere.

New singer and third studio album (2005–2007) 
After Nicole left the band, she was replaced by American soprano singer Melissa Ferlaak (formerly with Aesma Daeva) and Wolfgang Koch replaced Werner Fiedler. In 2006, Martin Harb, who already played with VoA on their tour in Mexico in 2003, replaced Miro Holly. In May 2007, VoA released their 3rd album Trinity, mastered at Finnvox Studios and recorded at Bavarian Dreamscape Studio). The following autumn brought Visions of Atlantis to the United States, where the band toured together with Epica for 6 weeks and won numerous new fans.

Departure of Melissa Ferlaak and Wolfgang Koch (2007–2008) 
Upon returning, the band went through changes in the lineup. On 28 November 2007, a message was posted on the official VoA website saying that Melissa Ferlaak and Wolfgang Koch had left the band, both citing personal reasons. Following this Visions of Atlantis announced a few days later that their ex guitarist, Werner Fiedler, had rejoined the band.

Joanna Nieniewska and Maxi Nil (2008–2009) 
After Melissa's departure, Visions of Atlantis not only looked for a replacement for a singer, but also wrote the material for the fourth album. The band advertised on their website the position for a female vocalist for several months, and on 3 September 2008, they finally announced that they had found a new female singer; however, her identity was not revealed until 1 February 2009, as the 20-year-old Austrian soprano vocalist Joanna Nieniewska.

On 29 July 2009, VoA announced that because of health problems, Joanna Nieniewska is no longer in the band but will continue to support VoA behind the scenes.

The band announced the replacement vocalist, Maxi Nil from Greece, and was also known for her work with On Thorns I Lay, guest with Moonspell and her former band Elysion.

Delta and Maria Magdalena EP (2010–2011) 
On 3 December 2010, VoA announced the new title of their 4th studio album Delta which was released on 25 February 2011 worldwide.

On 18 July 2011, bass player Mario Lochert left the band due to crucial internal differences. In a recent interview Harb said that the band is not planning on replacing him. Instead, they will continue without a bassist as a fixed band member.

In August 2011, the band announced the title of their first EP Maria Magdalena. It was released on 21 October 2011.

Death of Nicole Bogner and Ethera (2012–2013) 
On 6 January 2012, Visions of Atlantis announced on their Facebook and MySpace pages that former singer Nicole Bogner had died at the age of 27 after suffering from a severe disease over a long period of time. The band said that they were saddened to have lost their first vocalist, and expressed their gratitude to Bogner for her time with the band.

On 27 January 2012, the band announced the title Ethera for their upcoming album, which was scheduled to be released in 2012. Ethera was released on 22 March 2013. It was the first album with guitarist Christian Hermsdörfer and with no official bassist. It was dedicated to Bogner's memory.

Lineup changes and The Deep & the Dark (2013–2019) 

On 6 December 2013, Visions of Atlantis announced on their Facebook page that most of the lineup was parting ways with Visions of Atlantis, leaving the only remaining and founding member Thomas Caser on drums. This decision was mostly because of a desire from the parting members to play their own style of music, whilst the band was orientating to go back to its classic style. Thus, it welcomed back some of its old members: Werner Fiedler (guitars), Chris Kamper (synths), and Michael Koren (bass). Maxi Nil was replaced by Clémentine Delauney, and Mario Plank by Siegfried Samer. Michael Koren was replaced by Herbert Glos on bass in late 2017, and Werner Fiedler by Christian Douscha at the same time. Chris Kamper left the band in 2015.

Their new album The Deep & the Dark was released on 16 February 2018.

Wanderers and Pirates (2019–present) 
After extensive tours with Serenity and Kamelot as well as several festival shows in 2018, the band released their first live album The Deep & the Dark Live @ Symphonic Metal Nights on 16 February 2019, which featured new male lead singer Michele Guaitoli (from Italian symphonic metal band Temperance) sharing lead vocal duty with Siegfried Samer, the former having permanently replaced the latter at the end of the Symphonic Metal Nights IV tour in late 2018.

The band then announced on 1 July 2019 that their seventh album Wanderers will be released on 30 August 2019 via Napalm Records. The album again featured Clémentine Delauney and Michele Guaitoli sharing lead vocal duties.

During the pandemic in 2020, Visions Of Atlantis released their first live DVD / Bluray with the title A Symphonic Journey To Remember on October 30. The show was recorded at Bang-Your-Head festival in Germany back in 2019 together with the Bohemian Symphony Orchestra of Prague.

On March 7, 2022, the band announced their eighth album Pirates would be released on May 13. This album took Visions Of Atlantis to a higher level than before. With more orchestral arrangements and choirs, the band is not only fascinated the fans but also received a great response from the press.

Band members 

Current members
 Thomas Caser – drums 
 Clémentine Delauney – female vocals 
 Christian Douscha – guitars 
 Herbert Glos – bass  
 Michele Guaitoli – male vocals 

Previous members
Christian Stani – vocals 
Nicole Bogner – vocals 
Miro Holly – keyboards 
Mario Plank – vocals 
Melissa Ferlaak – vocals 
Wolfgang Koch – guitars 
Martin Harb – keyboards 
Joanna Nieniewska – vocals 
Maxi Nil – vocals 
Mario Lochert – bass 
Christian Hermsdörfer – guitars 
Raphael Saini – live drums 
Babis Nikou – live bass, vocals 
Werner Fiedler – guitars 
Chris Kamper – keyboards 
Michael Koren – bass 
 Siegfried Samer – lead vocals

Timeline

Discography 
Studio albums
Eternal Endless Infinity (2002)
Cast Away (2004)
Trinity (2007)
Delta (2011)
Ethera (2013)
The Deep & the Dark (2018)
Wanderers (2019)
Pirates (2022)
Live albums

 The Deep & The Dark Live @Symohonic Metal Nights (2019)
 A Symphonic Journey To Remember (2020)
 Pirates Over Wacken (2023)

EPs
Maria Magdalena (2011)
Old Routes – New Waters (2016)

Demos
Morning in Atlantis (2000)

Singles
"Lost" (2004)

Videos
"Lost" (2004)
"New Dawn" (2011)
"Winternight" (2016)
"The Silent Mutiny" (2018)
"The Deep & the Dark" (2018)
"The Last Home" (2018)
"A Journey to Remember" (2019)
"Nothing Lasts Forever" (2019)
"Legion of the Seas" (2022)
"Melancholy Angel" (2022)
"Master the Hurricane" (2022)
"Clocks" (2023)

Lyric videos
"Return to Lemuria" (2017)
"Words of War (Live)" (2019)
"Heroes of the Dawn" (2019)
"A Life of Our Own" (2019)

Trivia 
The song Lemuria from the album Cast Away was used by the organizer of the 2011 World Athletics Championship in Daegu (Kor) as beginning of the medal ceremonies.

The first official fan club VoA Sailors has existed since August 29, 2022.

References

External links 

Visions of Atlantis official website
Visions of Atlantis on Facebook
Visions of Atlantis on Instagram
Visions of Atlantis at Napalm Records
VoA Sailors - official website of the fanclub

2000 establishments in Austria
Austrian symphonic metal musical groups
Austrian power metal musical groups
Austrian heavy metal musical groups
Musical groups established in 2000
Musical quintets
Napalm Records artists